Adesmiini is a tribe of darkling beetles in the subfamily Pimeliinae of the family Tenebrionidae. There are about 11 genera in Adesmiini, found primarily in tropical Africa.

Genera
These genera belong to the tribe Adesmiini:
 Adesmia Fischer von Waldheim, 1822  (the Palearctic, tropical Africa, and Indomalaya)
 Alogenius Gebien, 1910  (tropical Africa)
 Epiphysa Dejean, 1834  (tropical Africa)
 Eustolopus Gebien, 1938  (tropical Africa)
 Metriopus Solier, 1835  (tropical Africa)
 Onymacris Allard, 1885  (tropical Africa)
 Orientocara Koch, 1952  (tropical Africa)
 Physadesmia Penrith, 1979  (tropical Africa)
 Renatiella Koch, 1944  (tropical Africa)
 Stenocara Solier, 1835  (tropical Africa)
 Stenodesia Reitter, 1916  (tropical Africa)

References

Further reading

 
 

Tenebrionoidea